In geology, macrocrystalline rocks have crystals large enough to easily be identified by sight. Macrocrystalline or phaneritic texture is common in intrusive igneous rocks which cooled slowly enough for crystal growth. Pegmatites are noted for very large crystal size.

Rocks with crystals requiring microscopic or X-ray analysis for identification are termed microcrystalline or cryptocrystalline.

Mineralogy
Petrology